Wabauskang First Nation is a Saulteaux First Nation in northwestern Ontario, and is a member of the Bimose Tribal Council and the Grand Council of Treaty 3. Their reserve is located at Wabauskang 21.

References

Saulteaux reserves in Ontario
First Nations governments in Ontario
Communities in Kenora District